Yair Iván Bonnín (born 20 September 1990) is an Argentine professional footballer who plays as a goalkeeper for Flandria.

References

External links
 
 Yair Bonnín at playmakerstats.com (English version of ceroacero.es)
 
 

1990 births
Living people
Sportspeople from Entre Ríos Province
Argentine footballers
Association football goalkeepers
Argentine expatriate footballers
Club de Gimnasia y Esgrima La Plata footballers
Rangers de Talca footballers
Flandria footballers
Primera B de Chile players
Primera Nacional players
Argentine Primera División players
Expatriate footballers in Chile
Argentine expatriate sportspeople in Chile